The Pecan Bowl was the name of some December college football bowl games played in two different eras. In 1946 and 1947, the game was contested between historically black colleges and universities (HBCUs). From 1964 through 1970, the game was a regional final within the NCAA's College Division.

History

HBCUs
The first games known as the Pecan Bowl were played in 1946 and 1947, with both games hosted (and won) by the South Carolina State Bulldogs.

College Division
The second set of games known as the Pecan Bowl were played in Texas from 1964 through 1970. The bowl was one of four regional finals in the College Division (which became Division II and Division III in 1973); it was not classified as a major bowl. The Pecan Bowl was the regional final for the Midwest region, bounded on the east by the Mississippi River and on the west by the states of Wyoming, Colorado, and New Mexico. The other three regional finals were the Tangerine (later Boardwalk), Grantland Rice, and Camellia bowls.

These Pecan Bowl games were originally played at Shotwell Stadium in Abilene, and after four years moved to Arlington's Memorial Stadium for the last three editions. The bowl name had been selected through a public contest in 1964, and was considered appropriate as Abilene is in the Texas pecan belt.

The first Midwest regional final was played in 1964 between the State College of Iowa (now the University of Northern Iowa) and Lamar Tech (now Lamar University), won by State College. Two schools made three appearances, North Dakota State and Arkansas State, with both winning twice and losing once. They played each other in 1968, won by top-ranked NDSU.

The Midwest regional final shifted to the Pioneer Bowl in Wichita Falls in 1971.

Game results

HBCUs

College Division

See also
 List of college bowl games

References

External links
1966 Pecan Bowl Game Film (Parsons in dark jerseys)

Defunct college football bowls